Terence Crawford is an Australian actor, author, theatre director, academic, and songwriter.

Early life and education
Terence Crawford graduated from the National Institute of Dramatic Art in Sydney as an actor in 1984.

He achieved a Masters of Creative Arts from James Cook University in 2000 with his dissertation on Chekhov in an Australian cultural context. His PhD thesis, from University of Sydney in 2015, was entitled "Real Human in this Fantastical World: Political, Artistic and Fictive concerns of actors in rehearsal: an ethnography".

Career
Crawford has acted with many of Australia's major theatre companies, as well as in television programs and films, including The Babadook and Stateless.

In 2017 and 2018 he toured Australia, and to the Auckland and Singapore Arts Festivals, playing O'Brien in Headlong, Almeida Theatre and Nottingham Playhouse's production of Duncan MacMillan and Robert Icke's adaptation of George Orwell's 1984.

As a playwright, Crawford's work has been produced by many theatre companies including Griffin Theatre Company Theatre or Image and Sydney Theatre Company as well as for radio and television.

He has directed productions of many Shakespearean plays.

Academia
In addition to teaching acting Crawford has taught play-writing, dramaturgy, and directing at under-graduate and post-graduate levels.

He has held head of acting positions at the following institutions:  Theatre Nepean (NSW), TTRP (Singapore) (now ITI), LASALLE College of the Arts (Singapore), and Adelaide College of the Arts (ACArts). He has also been a director at WAAPA and a guest at L'École Internationale de Théâtre Jacques Lecoq (Paris).

Other roles and recognition
In 2018 Crawford gave the keynote address at the inaugural AusAct conference, at Charles Sturt University, and in 2013 he was honoured by the University of Adelaide, which awarded him the title of adjunct professor.

He has written many songs with songwriting partner Richard Davies as well as on his own. These songs have featured in various theatrical and musical contexts, and are played by his current band, Almost Evelyn.

Selected publications
Dimensions of Acting: An Australian Approach Currency Press 2011;  
Trade Secrets: Australian Actors and Their Craft Currency Press 2005;  
 "The Castanet Club: History, provenance and influence". Australasian Drama Studies, No. 66, Apr 2015: [225]-252.  ISSN: 0810–4123.
 "Feudal positions and the pathology of contentment: Sites of disconnection for Australian theatre actors". About Performance, No. 13, 2015: 23–43.  ISSN: 1324–6089.
 "Finding the light: Acting as an artistic and social project" Fusion Journal, no. 15, 2019, pp. 6–17. 
 "Real Human in this Fantastical World: Political, Artistic and Fictive Concerns of Actors in Rehearsal: An Ethnography"

References

External links

 

Living people
Australian actors
Australian acting coaches
Year of birth missing (living people)